Jemima Rooper (born 24 October 1981) is a British actress. Having started as a child actress in television series, she has appeared in numerous film and theatre roles.

Background
Born in Hammersmith, London, Rooper is the daughter of TV journalist Alison Rooper. She attended Redcliffe Primary School in Chelsea and the Godolphin and Latymer School. While working on The Famous Five, she passed eight GCSEs with A* and A grades. From there she went to MPW sixth form college where she got three A-grade A levels. Rooper bought her first home at the age of 19.

Early career
Rooper expressed a wish to be an actress at the age of nine and contacted an agent. Her first professional roles were in the 1993 film The Higher Mortals and the 1994 film Willie's War. In 1996, she appeared in all episodes as George in Enid Blyton's The Famous Five.

She said:

After several small roles in British TV series, Jemima took the role of Nicki Sutton in the popular Channel 4 teenage series As If, which successfully ran for three years. Her next appearance was in the supernatural drama Hex where she played a lovable lesbian ghost named Thelma. Hex aired on Sky One and ran for two series between 2004 and 2005.

Later career
Rooper made her Hollywood debut in The Black Dahlia. In 2008 she starred in the TV series Lost in Austen In 2013 she played a role as Medusa in Atlantis  (TV series). Also guest starred in Agatha Christie's Poirot. She also played a lead role in Her Naked Skin, a new play at the National Theatre. In December 2010, Rooper was cast in the musical Me and My Girl at Sheffield's Crucible Theatre, alongside Miriam Margolyes. Having been featured in films including The Railway Children, A Sound of Thunder, Kinky Boots, One Chance and The F Word  (as the on-screen sister of Daniel Radcliffe's character) since 2003, she has since appeared in numerous guest roles on British series including Father Brown.

Stage
Rooper was seen on stage in One Man, Two Guvnors, which was favourably reviewed. She has since appeared in Blithe Spirit and Breeders in the West End.

Filmography

Film

Television

Theatre
 Where Do We Live – Royal Court Theatre, Jerwood Theatre Upstairs, May 2002 (playing Lily)
 Us and Them – Hampstead Theatre, June 2003 (playing Izzie)
 A Respectable Wedding (part of The Big Brecht Fest) – Young Vic, April 2007 (playing Bride)
 Her Naked Skin – National Theatre, July 2008 (playing Eve Douglas)
 The Great Game: Afghanistan – Tricycle Theatre, April – June 2009
 The Power of Yes – National Theatre October 2009
 All My Sons – Apollo Theatre, May – October 2010 (playing Ann Deever)
 Me and My Girl – Jan 2011 (playing Sally)
 One Man, Two Guvnors- National Theatre June 2011 (playing Rachel Crabbe)
 Blithe Spirit – Gielgud Theatre, March 2014 (playing Elvira)
 Breeders by Ben Ockrent – St James Theatre, September 2014
 Blithe Spirit – Ahmanson Theater, Los Angeles, December 2014 – January 2015 (playing Elvira)
 Hand to God – Vaudeville Theatre, London, February 2016
 Little Shop of Horrors  – Regent's Park Open Air Theatre, London, August – September 2018 (playing Audrey)

References

External links
 
 Jemima Rooper's Naked Skin, Stephen Armstrong, The Times, 13 July 2008
 

1981 births
Living people
English film actresses
English stage actresses
English television actresses
English voice actresses
People educated at Godolphin and Latymer School
People from Hammersmith
Actresses from London
20th-century English actresses
21st-century English actresses
English child actresses
English radio actresses